HDMS Nordkaperen (S321) was a  of the Royal Danish Navy. She was built to the German Type 205 design at the naval dockyard in Copenhagen where she was laid down on 4 March 1966. She was launched on 18 December 1969, and was commissioned into the Royal Danish Navy on 22 December 1970. In 1994, Nordkaperen and sister ship  were modified to bring their technical performance more in line with the Royal Danish Navy's newer . Nordkaperen was decommissioned on 2 February 2004.

References 
 

Narhvalen-class submarines
Ships built in Copenhagen
1969 ships